Oumar Sidibé may refer to:

 Oumar Sidibé (footballer, born 1990), Malian football midfielder 
 Oumar Sidibé (footballer, born 2001), French football winger